This is a list of all published works of John F. MacArthur, an evangelical Bible expositor, pastor-teacher of Grace Community Church, and president of The Master's Seminary, in Sun Valley, California. In addition to more than 150 individual books and monographs, MacArthur has also contributed to more than 30 multi-author works. His publications have been translated into more than two dozen languages, including ten or more titles each in French, Spanish, Romanian, German, Korean, Russian, Portuguese, and Italian.

A 2001 Duke Divinity School survey asking pastors "...what three authors do you read most often...?" concluded that MacArthur was among the top twelve for Conservative Protestants. A similar 2005 study by The Barna Group concluded that he was one of six authors "who had the greatest number of influential books listed by pastors."

Bibles
The MacArthur Study Bible (1997) Word
The MacArthur Topical Bible (1999) Word
The MacArthur Student Bible (2001) Word
MacArthur Daily Bible (2003) Thomas Nelson
The MacArthur Study Bible: New American Standard Version (2006) Thomas Nelson
The MacArthur Study Bible: English Standard Version (2009) Crossway
The MacArthur Study Bible: New International Version (2013) Thomas Nelson

Commentary and Bible study
Liberated for Life (Galatians) (1975) Regal
Beware the Pretenders (Jude) (1980) Victor
How to Study the Bible (1985, 2009) Moody 
How to Get the Most from God's Word: An Everyday Guide to Enrich Your Study of the Bible (1997) Word
MacArthur's Quick Reference Guide to the Bible (2002) Word
MacArthur Bible Handbook (2003) Thomas Nelson
MacArthur Scripture Memory System (2003) Nelson Reference & Electronic Publishing

The MacArthur New Testament Commentaries
published by Moody Press
Hebrews (1983)
1 Corinthians (1984)
Matthew 1-7 (1985)
Ephesians (1986)
Galatians (1987)
Matthew 8-15 (1987)
Matthew 16-23 (1988)
Matthew 24-28 (1989)
Romans 1-8 (1991)
Colossians/Philemon (1992)
Acts 1-12 (1994)
Romans 9-16 (1994)
1 Timothy (1995)
2 Timothy (1995)
Acts 13-28 (1996)
Titus (1996)
Revelation 1-11 (1999)
Revelation 12-22 (2000)
Philippians (2001)
1 & 2 Thessalonians (2002)
2 Corinthian (2003)
 James (2003)
1 Peter (2005)
2 Peter and Jude (2005)
John 1-11 (2006)
1-3 John (2007)
John 12-21 (2008)
Luke 1-5 (2009)
Luke 6-10 (2011)
Luke 11-17 (2013)

MacArthur Bible Studies
published by Word
1 & 2 Peter (2000)
1 Samuel (2000) Word
Acts (2000) Word
Daniel (2000) Word
Ephesians (2000) Word
Galatians (2000) Word
John (2000) Word
Mark (2000) Word
Romans (2000) Word
Ruth & Esther (2000) Word
1 & 2 Timothy (2001) Word
1 Corinthians (2001) Word
Hebrews (2001) Word
James (2001) Word
Nehemiah (2001) Word
Revelation (2001) Word

published by Nelson Impact (a division of Thomas Nelson)
1 Corinthians (2006) 
Mark (2006)
Acts (2006)
Galatians (2006)
John (2006)
Romans (2006)

MacArthur Study Series
first published by Victor, then by David C. Cook
Saved Without a Doubt: Being Sure of Your Salvation (1992, 2006) 
Alone with God: Rediscovering the Power and Passion of Prayer (1995, 2006) 
First Love: The Joy and Simplicity of Life in Christ (1995) 
The Power of Suffering: Strengthening Your Faith in the Refiner's Fire (1995) 
The Power of Suffering: Strengthening Your Faith in the Refiner's Fire (repackaged) (2005) David C Cook 
Standing Strong: How to Resist the Enemy of Your Soul (2006) 
Divine Design: God's Complementary Roles for Men and Women (2006) 
Anxious for Nothing: God's Cure for the Cares of Your Soul (2006) 
The Believer's Walk With Christ (2017) 
The Shepherd as Theologian (2017)

Individual books

1970s
The Church: The Body of Christ (1973) Zondervan
Found: God's Will (1973, 1977) Victor
Can a Man Live Again? (1975) Moody
Keys to Spiritual Growth (1976) Revell
Focus on Fact: Why You Can Trust the Bible (1977) Revell
God's Plan for Giving (1977) Western Baptist Press
Giving: God's Way (1978) Tyndale
The Charismatics: A Doctrinal Perspective (1978) Zondervan

1980s
Kingdom Living: Here and Now (1980) Moody
Take God's Word For It (1980) Regal
Why Believe the Bible (1980) Regal
Jesus' Pattern of Prayer (1981) Moody
Body Dynamics (1982) Victor
The Family (1982) Moody
Your Family (1982) Moody
The Ultimate Priority (1983) Moody
Why I Trust the Bible (1983) Victor
The Legacy of Jesus (1986) Moody
The Gospel According to Jesus (1988), Zondervan
The Lordship Controversy (1988) Word of Grace Communications
When the Healing Doesn't Come (1988) Word of Grace Communications
You Can Trust the Bible (1988) Moody
God With Us: The Miracle of Christmas (1989), Zondervan
Shepherdology (1989) The Master's Fellowship

1990s
Keys to Spiritual Growth (1991) Revell
Our Sufficiency in Christ (1991) Word
The Master's Plan for the Church (1991) Moody
Charismatic Chaos (1992) Zondervan
How to Meet the Enemy (1992) ChariotVictor Publishing
Rediscovering Expository Preaching (1992) Word
Anxiety Attacked: Apply Scripture to the Cares of the Soul (1993) ChariotVictor Publishing
Ashamed of the Gospel: When the Church Becomes Like the World (1993) Crossway
Drawing Near (1993) Crossway
Faith Works: The Gospel According to the Apostles (1993) Word
republished in 2000 as The Gospel According to the Apostles
republished in 2005 by Thomas Nelson
God: Coming Face to Face with His Majesty (1993) Victor
Different By Design (1994) ChariotVictor Publishing
Reckless Faith: When the Church Loses its Will to Discern (1994) Word
The Vanishing Conscience (1994) Word
republished in 2005 by Thomas Nelson
The Body Dynamic: Finding Where You Fit in Today's Church (1996) ChariotVictor Publishing
The Glory of Heaven: The Truth About Heaven, Angels, and Eternal Life. (1996) Crossway
The Love of God: He Will Do Whatever it Takes to Make Us Holy (1996) Word
The Silent Shepherd: The Care, the Comfort, and the Correction of the Holy Spirit (1996) ChariotVictor Publishing
Strength for Today (1997) Crossway
The Power of Integrity: Building a Life Without Compromise (1997) Crossway
In the Footsteps of Faith: Lessons to Learn From Great Men and Women of the Bible (1998) Crossway
Our Sufficiency in Christ (1998) Crossway
Successful Christian Parenting (1998) Word
The Freedom and Power of Forgiveness (1998) Good News
republished in 2009 by Crossway 
The Only Way to Happiness (1998) Moody
The Pillars of Christian Character: The Essential Attitudes of a Living Faith (1998) Crossway
I Believe in Jesus: Leading Your Child to Christ (1999) Nelson
Nothing but the Truth (1999) Crossway
The Second Coming (1999, 2005) Crossway

2000s
Biblical Parenting for Life (Student's & Teacher's Manuals) (2000) Word (Out of Print)
O Worship the King (book & CD) (2000) Crossway
The Murder of Jesus (2000) Word
also Participant's Guide
revised in 2004 by Thomas Nelson
Whose Money Is It, Anyway? (2000) Word (Out of Print)
Why Government Can't Save You (2000) Word
A Bright Tomorrow (2001) Crossway
God in the Manger (2001) Word
How to Survive in a World of Unbelievers (2001) Word (Out of Print)
O Come All Ye Faithful (book & CD) (2001) Crossway
Our Awesome God (2001) Crossway
Terrorism, Jihad, and the Bible (2001) Word
The Battle for the Beginning (2001) Word
republished in 2005 by Thomas Nelson
The God Who Loves (2001) Word
The Keys to Spiritual Growth (2001) Crossway
Truth for Today (2001) J. Countryman (a division of Thomas Nelson)
Can God Bless America? (2002) Word
Twelve Ordinary Men (2002) Word
What Wondrous Love Is This (book & CD) (2002) Crossway
When Morning Guilds the Skies (book & CD) (2002) Crossway
Why One Way (2002) Word
Hard to Believe (2003) Thomas Nelson
Lord, Teach Me to Pray (2003) J. Countryman (a division of Thomas Nelson)
Safe in the Arms of God (2003) Thomas Nelson
Think Biblically! (2003) Crossway
Unleashing God's Word in Your Life (2003) Thomas Nelson
Follow Me (2004) J. Countryman (a division of Thomas Nelson)
The Book on Leadership (2004) Nelson
Truth Matters (2004) Thomas Nelson
The Gospel According to the Apostles (2005) Thomas Nelson 
The Heart of the Bible (2005) Nelson Reference & Electronic Publishing
Twelve Extraordinary Women (2005) Moody
Experiencing the Passion of Christ (Student Edition) (2006) Nelson Impact
The Quest for Character (2006) Thomas Nelson 
Because the Time Is Near: John MacArthur Explains the Book of Revelation (2007) Moody 
The Extraordinary Mother: Blessings for You from Bible Moms (2007) J. Countryman 
The Truth War: Fighting for Certainty in an Age of Deception (2007) Nelson 
The God Who Loves: He Will Do Whatever It Takes to Draw Us to Him (2008) Thomas Nelson  
A Tale of Two Sons: The Inside Story of a Father, His Sons, and a Shocking Murder (2008) Thomas Nelson  
Right Thinking in a World Gone Wrong: A Biblical Response to Today's Most Controversial Issues (2009) Harvest House 
The Jesus You Can't Ignore: What You Must Learn from the Bold Confrontations of Christ (2009) Thomas Nelson

2010s
Ashamed of the Gospel: When the Church Becomes Like The World (3rd Edition [2010]), Crossway 
Slave: The Hidden Truth About Your Identity in Christ (2010), Thomas Nelson 
Truth Endures: Landmark Sermons From Forty Years of Unleashing God's Truth One Verse at a Time (2011), Crossway 
At The Throne of Grace: A Book of Prayers (2011), Harvest House 
The Truth About Grace (2012), Thomas Nelson 
Worship: The Ultimate Priority (2012), Moody Publishers 
One Perfect Life: The Complete Story of Jesus (2013), Thomas Nelson 
Strange Fire: The Danger of Offending the Holy Spirit with Counterfeit Worship (2013), Thomas Nelson
Parables (2015), Thomas Nelson
The Deity of Christ (2017), Moody Publishers 
The Gospel According to Paul (2017), Thomas Nelson  
None Other: Discovering the God of the Bible (2017), Ligonier Ministries 
Good News: The Gospel of Jesus Christ (2018), Reformation Trust Publishing 
The Gospel According to God (2018), Crossway 
Christ's Call to Reform the Church: Timeless Demands from the Lord to His People (2018) Moody Publishers 
Final Word: Why We Need the Bible (2019), Reformation Trust Publishing 
One Faithful Life: A Harmony of the Life and Writings of the Apostle Paul (2019) Thomas Nelson 
Stand Firm: Living in a Post-Christian Culture (2020), Reformation Trust Publishing

Juvenile
A Faith to Grow On (2000, 2004) Thomas Nelson
A Faith to Grow on Journal (2004) Thomas Nelson
A Faith to Grow On Bible (2005) Thomas Nelson

The Master's Seminary Journal articles
"The Mandate of Biblical Inerrancy: Expository Preaching" - originally published under the title "Inerrancy and Preaching: Where Exposition and Exegesis Come Together" in Hermeneutics, Inerrancy, and the Bible
"The Psychology Epidemic and Its Cure" - adapted from Our Sufficiency in Christ
"Perseverance of the Saints" - adapted from Faith Works: The Gospel According to the Apostles (1993)
"Mortification of Sin" - adapted from The Vanishing Conscience (1994)
"Evangelicals and Catholics Together" - adapted from Reckless Faith: When the Church Loses Its Will to Discern (1995)
"The Love of God for Humanity" - adapted from The Love of God (1996)
"In Defense of Integrity" - adapted from The Power of Integrity (1997)
"Visions of the Glorious Christ" (1999)
"Is Christ's Return Imminent?" - adapted from The Second Coming (2000)
"Open Theism's Attack on the Atonement" - subsequently published in Taming the Lion: The Openness of God and the Failure of Imagination (2001)
"Creation: Believe It or Not (Genesis 1:1)" - previously published in The Battle for the Beginning: The Bible on Creation and the Fall of Adam (2002)
"Does God Still Give Revelation?" - adapted from Charismatic Chaos (2003)
"The Sufficiency of Scripture" - adapted from Our Sufficiency in Christ (2004)
"A Challenge for Christian Communicators" (2006)
"Perspicuity of Scripture: The Emergent Approach" (2006)
"God’s Word on Homosexuality: The Truth About Sin and the Reality of Forgiveness" (2008)

Notes

References

External links

Bibliographies by writer
Bibliographies of American writers
Christian bibliographies